Jacques Hardion (17 October 1686, Tours – 2 October 1766, Versailles) was a French historian, scholar and translator from ancient Greek.

After studying at Tours, he earned a place as tutor to Nicolas-François Dupré de Saint-Maur. He was elected member of the Academy of Inscriptions and Belles Lettres in 1728 and the Académie française in 1730.  Having been appointed librarian of the king and the royal family at Versailles, he was chosen to give lessons in history and literature to children of Louis XV.

1686 births
1766 deaths
French classical scholars
Translators to French
18th-century French historians
Translators from Greek
Members of the Académie des Inscriptions et Belles-Lettres
Members of the Académie Française
French male non-fiction writers
18th-century French translators